Chris Hayes (born 1979) is an American journalist.

Chris Hayes may also refer to:

 Chris Hayes (American football) (born 1972), American football player
 Chris Hayes (ice hockey) (born 1946), Canadian ice hockey player
 Chris Hayes (jockey) (born 1987), Irish jockey
 Chris Hayes (musician), American musician with Huey Lewis and the News, 1980–2001
 Chris Hayes (politician) (born 1955), Australian politician
 Chris Hayes (skydiver), Canadian skydiver
 Chris Hayes (baseball) (born 1973), American college baseball coach
 Christopher Hayes (figure skater), American ice dancer, see 1999 United States Figure Skating Championships

See also
 Chris Hay (born 1974), Scottish footballer